Joseph or Joe Davies may refer to:

Sportsmen
Joe Davies (footballer, born 1864) (1864–1943), Newton Heath F.C., Wolverhampton Wanderers F.C. and Wales international footballer
Joe Davies (footballer, born 1870) (1870–?), Everton F.C., Manchester City F.C., Sheffield United F.C. and Wales international footballer
Joe Davies (footballer, born 1926) (1926–1973), Chester City F.C. player
Joe Davies (cricketer) (born 1992), English cricketer
Joe Davies (rugby union) (born 1995), Welsh rugby union player

Others
Joseph E. Davies (1876–1958), United States ambassador to the Soviet Union
Joseph John Davies (1889–1976), British soldier
Joseph Davies (Australian politician) (1880–1954), Australian politician
Joseph Davies (British politician) (1866–1954), UK Member of Parliament for Crewe elected 1918
Joseph Davies (priest) (1890–1952), Dean of Monmouth
Joseph Davies (magazine editor) (died 1831), Welsh solicitor and magazine publisher

See also
Joseph Hamilton Daveiss (1774–1811), soldier
Joe Davis (disambiguation) (includes Joe and Joseph)